The coastal leaf-toed gecko or Tumbesian leaf-toed gecko (Phyllodactylus kofordi) is a species of lizard in the family Phyllodactylidae. The species is endemic to South America.

Taxonomy
P. kofordi was described by James R. Dixon and Raymond B. Huey in 1970.

Etymology
The specific name, kofordi, is in honor of American zoologist Carl B. Koford.

Description

Geographic range
P. kofordi is found in Peru and southern Ecuador.

The type locality of this gecko is the Cerro La Vieja in the Peruvian Region of Lambayeque.

Reproduction
P. kofordi is oviparous.

References

Further reading
Dixon JR, Huey RB (1970). "Systematics of the Lizards of the Gekkonid Genus Phyllodactylus of Mainland South America". Contributions in Science, Natural History Museum of Los Angeles County (192): 1-78. (Phyllodactylus kofordi, new species, pp. 39–42).

kofordi
Reptiles of Ecuador
Reptiles of Peru
Reptiles described in 1970
Taxa named by James R. Dixon